"Jordan" is a musical composition by American musician Buckethead. Originally featured as a playable track on the 2006 music video game Guitar Hero II, "Jordan" was officially released as a downloadable single via iTunes on August 18, 2009.

Background

Prior to the inclusion of a studio version of "Jordan" on Guitar Hero II, the instrumental was performed live by Buckethead at a number of shows. While performing the track, Buckethead would omit the guitar solos and interpolate another song (often "Post Office Buddy" from Giant Robot), a series of songs or an improvisation. One such early live version was released as "Vertebrae" on the Praxis live album Tennessee 2004 in 2007. Since the release of the studio version, Buckethead has often included the solo in his live performances of "Jordan".

An alternate version of "Jordan" was re-created specifically for the video game Guitar Hero II. It is considered one of the most difficult tracks to play in the series on Expert difficulty, due to the complexity of its guitar solos, particularly the "Guitar Solo B" and "Guitar Solo C" sections. On the Xbox 360 version, the "Kick the Bucket Award" is an achievement worth 30 gamerscore, and is awarded for completing "Jordan" on Expert difficulty.

The fastest tapping portions of the solo reach approximately 15.47 notes per second (32nd-notes @ 116 BPM in a 4/4 meter). In this part of the solo, Buckethead frets the notes using only his left hand, instead of resorting to two-handed tapping.

The picking portion of the solo reaches a speed of 11.6 notes per second (16th-note triplets @ 116 BPM in a 4/4 meter).

The Guitar Hero series' resident guitarist Marcus Henderson stated that Buckethead feels "Jordan" to be one of the best things he has ever recorded. It was also stated in an interview with Henderson that "Jordan" is named after Michael Jordan, of whom Buckethead is a huge fan, even referencing the single cover to the Jumpman logo seen on many Jordan-related merchandise, like the Air Jordan shoe brand.

Technique

The main riff of "Jordan" is played using left hand hammer-ons and pull-offs, while Buckethead's right hand uses his trademark kill switch. The main guitar riff also features extensive use of a Digitech Whammy pitch shifter. The off-beat 16th note rhythm scheme is reminiscent of Buckethead's earlier songs "Jump Man" (also dedicated to Michael Jordan) and "Night of the Slunk", both first released on Monsters and Robots (1999).

According to Travis Dickerson, operator of the studio where "Jordan" was recorded, "the take ultimately used [for the studio version] was played in one unbroken, unedited pass".

References

Video game soundtracks
Rock instrumentals
Buckethead songs
Cultural depictions of Michael Jordan
Songs about basketball players
2009 singles
2006 songs